Ezekiel Tetteh  (born April 30, 1992) is a Ghanaian football player playing as a forward for Great Olympics.

Professional career

Hearts of Oak
Ezekiel on 9 January 2014 signed his first professional contract for Ghanaian premier league outfit  Accra Hearts of Oak. Tetteh scored six goals in seven Division One League matches and two in three Middle League matches for Okwahu United in the 2013 division one competition. Injury was the main cause for his short stint at the club making only three appearances for the Phobians.

Kerkuk FC
Ezekiel had a stint with Kirkuk SC in Iraq from (2014-2015).

Alamal SC Atbara
With just a short belt at Kerkuk FC, he then signed with Sudanese Premier League outfit Alamal SC Atbara in the 2015-2016 transfer windows.

Al Ahly Shendi
After a successful debut season with Alamal SC Atbara, Al Ahly Shendi quickly send in transfer request with strive competition from Al Khartoum FC. He finally landed a three-year contract with Shendi state club Al-Ahly Shendi in 2016 replacing  Nigerian Kelechi Osunwa who banged in a record 38 goals the previous season and joined Al Merreikh.

Tetteh moved to Dire Dawa City S.C. August 2018.

Achievement
 Goal King Award, Ghana Division One League

References

External links
 westafricanfootball.com
 
 citifmonline.com
 ghanasoccernet.com
 newsghana.com.gh
 africanfootball.com
 pulse.com.gh 
 ghanaplus.com
 peacefmonline.com

1992 births
Living people
Ghanaian footballers
Ghanaian expatriate footballers
Ghana international footballers
Association football forwards
Footballers from Accra
Accra Hearts of Oak S.C. players
Al-Ahly Shendi players
Okwawu United players
Dire Dawa City S.C. players
Accra Great Olympics F.C. players
Ghanaian expatriate sportspeople in Iraq
Ghanaian expatriate sportspeople in Sudan
Ghanaian expatriate sportspeople in Ethiopia
Expatriate footballers in Iraq
Expatriate footballers in Sudan
Expatriate footballers in Ethiopia
Alamal SC Atbara players